Harvest Moon: The Lost Valley, known in North America as Harvest Moon 3D: The Lost Valley, is a farm simulation role-playing game developed by Tabot, Inc. for the Nintendo 3DS. It was released in North America on November 4, 2014, in Europe on June 19, 2015 and in Australia on June 20, 2015.

Development
The game was first announced during E3 2014 by Natsume. Unlike previous titles in the Story of Seasons series, called Harvest Moon in the Western markets, the game was not developed by Japanese developer Marvelous. Their newest entry in the Story of Seasons series is being published in North America and Europe by Xseed Games. Natsume owns the rights to the "Harvest Moon" brand in those territories.

Gameplay
Players are able to modify their home such as expanding it and moving items around on the inside of their home, though the player's home cannot be moved from its original place. Players can also modify their world, including terrain elevations and building locations. Players are also able to get married, have a child, buy pets and help villagers with requests.

Reception

The game received "unfavorable" reviews according to the review aggregation website Metacritic.

References

External links
 

2014 video games
Story of Seasons games
Nintendo 3DS games
Nintendo 3DS eShop games
Nintendo 3DS-only games
Nintendo Network games
Video games developed in Japan
Video games featuring protagonists of selectable gender
Video games scored by Tsukasa Tawada
Single-player video games
Natsume (company) games